Izet Redžepagić (1955 – 2007) was a professional footballer who played in the former Yugoslavia and Turkey.

Club career
Born in Yugoslavia, Redžepagić started playing football for local side FK Borac Banja Luka in the Yugoslav First League. He would also join fellow First League side NK Osijek.

In 1986, Redžepagić moved to Turkey, joining Süper Lig side Dardanelspor for one seasons. He made 22 leagues appearances for the club.

Personal life
Redžepagić died from a long illness in 2007.

References

External links
 EX YU Fudbalska Statistika po godinama
 

1955 births
2007 deaths
Association football forwards
Yugoslav footballers
FK Borac Banja Luka players
NK Osijek players
Dardanelspor footballers
Yugoslav First League players
TFF First League players
Yugoslav expatriate footballers
Expatriate footballers in Turkey
Yugoslav expatriate sportspeople in Turkey